= Hnonae =

- Location of in Burma
- Coordinates: 22°31′N 96°17′E
- Country: Burma
- Division: Mandalay Division

Population (2005)
  - Religions: Buddhism
- Time zone: UTC+6.30 (MST)

Hnonae is a town in the Mandalay Division of Myanmar, located approximately 100 km north of Mandalay.
